In geometry, the incircle or inscribed circle of a triangle is the largest circle that can be contained in the triangle; it touches (is tangent to) the three sides. The center of the incircle is a triangle center called the triangle's incenter.

An excircle or escribed circle of the triangle is a circle lying outside the triangle, tangent to one of its sides and tangent to the extensions of the other two. Every triangle has three distinct excircles, each tangent to one of the triangle's sides.

The center of the incircle, called the incenter, can be found as the intersection of the three internal angle bisectors. The center of an excircle is the intersection of the internal bisector of one angle (at vertex , for example) and the external bisectors of the other two. Because the internal bisector of an angle is perpendicular to its external bisector, it follows that the center of the incircle together with the three excircle centers form an orthocentric system. but not all polygons do; those that do are tangential polygons. See also tangent lines to circles.

Incircle and incenter

Suppose  has an incircle with radius  and center .

Incenter
The incenter is the point where the internal angle bisectors of  meet.

The distance from vertex  to the incenter  is:

Trilinear coordinates
The trilinear coordinates for a point in the triangle is the ratio of all the distances to the triangle sides. Because the incenter is the same distance from all sides of the triangle, the trilinear coordinates for the incenter are

Barycentric coordinates
The barycentric coordinates for a point in a triangle give weights such that the point is the weighted average of the triangle vertex positions.
Barycentric coordinates for the incenter are given by

Cartesian coordinates
The Cartesian coordinates of the incenter are a weighted average of the coordinates of the three vertices using the side lengths of the triangle relative to the perimeter (that is, using the barycentric coordinates given above, normalized to sum to unity) as weights. The weights are positive so the incenter lies inside the triangle as stated above.

Radius
 where 

See Heron's formula.

Distances to the vertices

Additionally,

Other properties
The collection of triangle centers may be given the structure of a group under coordinate-wise multiplication of trilinear coordinates; in this group, the incenter forms the identity element.

Incircle and its radius properties

Distances between vertex and nearest touchpoints
The distances from a vertex to the two nearest touchpoints are equal; for example:

Other properties
Then the incircle has the radius

and the area of the triangle is

Some relations among the sides, incircle radius, and circumcircle radius are:

Any line through a triangle that splits both the triangle's area and its perimeter in half goes through the triangle's incenter (the center of its incircle). There are either one, two, or three of these for any given triangle.

and

The incircle radius is no greater than one-ninth the sum of the altitudes.

The squared distance from the incenter  to the circumcenter  is given by
,

and the distance from the incenter to the center  of the nine point circle is
 

The incenter lies in the medial triangle (whose vertices are the midpoints of the sides).

Relation to area of the triangle

The radius of the incircle is related to the area of the triangle. The ratio of the area of the incircle to the area of the triangle is less than or equal to 
, 
with equality holding only for equilateral triangles.

Suppose 
 
has an incircle with radius  and center .
 
is right. Thus, the radius  is an altitude of 
. 
Therefore,
 
has base length  and height , and so has area 
.
Similarly, 

has area

and 

has area
.
Since these three triangles decompose 
, we see that the area 
 
is:
 and 

For an alternative formula, consider . The large triangle is composed of six such triangles and the total area is:

Gergonne triangle and point

The Gergonne triangle (of ) is defined by the three touchpoints of the incircle on the three sides. The touchpoint opposite  is denoted , etc.

Its area is 

This is the same area as that of the extouch triangle.

The Gergonne point lies in the open orthocentroidal disk punctured at its own center, and can be any point therein.

The Gergonne point of a triangle has a number of properties, including that it is the symmedian point of the Gergonne triangle.

Trilinear coordinates for the vertices of the intouch triangle are given by

Trilinear coordinates for the Gergonne point are given by 

or, equivalently, by the Law of Sines,

Excircles and excenters

An excircle or escribed circle of the triangle is a circle lying outside the triangle, tangent to one of its sides and tangent to the extensions of the other two. Every triangle has three distinct excircles, each tangent to one of the triangle's sides.

The center of an excircle is the intersection of the internal bisector of one angle (at vertex , for example) and the external bisectors of the other two. Because the internal bisector of an angle is perpendicular to its external bisector, it follows that the center of the incircle together with the three excircle centers form an orthocentric system.

Trilinear coordinates of excenters

Exradii
The radii of the excircles are called the exradii. 

The exradius of the excircle opposite  (so touching , centered at ) is 
  where 

See Heron's formula.

Derivation of exradii formula

radius be  and its center be . 

Then 
 
is an altitude of 
, 
so  
has area 
. 
By a similar argument,

has area

and

has area
.
Thus the area

of triangle
 
is
 .

So, by symmetry, denoting  as the radius of the incircle,
 .

By the Law of Cosines, we have
 

Combining this with the identity , we have
 

But , and so

which is Heron's formula.

Similarly,  gives

and

Other properties
From the formulas above one can see that the excircles are always larger than the incircle and that the largest excircle is the one tangent to the longest side and the smallest excircle is tangent to the shortest side. Further, combining these formulas yields:

Other excircle properties
The circular hull of the excircles is internally tangent to each of the excircles and is thus an Apollonius circle.

The circle through the centers of the three excircles has radius .

Nagel triangle and Nagel point 

The circumcircle of the extouch  is called the Mandart circle.

The splitters intersect in a single point, the triangle's Nagel point  (or triangle center X8).

Trilinear coordinates for the vertices of the extouch triangle are given by
 
 

Trilinear coordinates for the Nagel point are given by 

or, equivalently, by the Law of Sines,

The Nagel point is the isotomic conjugate of the Gergonne point.

Related constructions

Nine-point circle and Feuerbach point

In geometry, the nine-point circle is a circle that can be constructed for any given triangle. It is so named because it passes through nine significant concyclic points defined from the triangle. These nine points are:

 The midpoint of each side of the triangle
 The foot of each altitude
 The midpoint of the line segment from each vertex of the triangle to the orthocenter (where the three altitudes meet; these line segments lie on their respective altitudes).

In 1822, Karl Feuerbach discovered that any triangle's nine-point circle is externally tangent to that triangle's three excircles and internally tangent to its incircle; this result is known as Feuerbach's theorem. He proved that:
... the circle which passes through the feet of the altitudes of a triangle is tangent to all four circles which in turn are tangent to the three sides of the triangle ... 

The triangle center at which the incircle and the nine-point circle touch is called the Feuerbach point.

Incentral and excentral triangles
Trilinear coordinates for the vertices of the incentral triangle are given by
 
 

The excentral triangle of a reference triangle has vertices at the centers of the reference triangle's excircles. Its sides are on the external angle bisectors of the reference triangle (see figure at top of page). Trilinear coordinates for the vertices of the excentral triangle are given by

Equations for four circles
The four circles described above are given equivalently by either of the two given equations:
 Incircle:

-excircle:

 -excircle:

-excircle:

Euler's theorem
Euler's theorem states that in a triangle:

For excircles the equation is similar:

Generalization to other polygons
Some (but not all) quadrilaterals have an incircle. These are called tangential quadrilaterals. Among their many properties perhaps the most important is that their two pairs of opposite sides have equal sums. This is called the Pitot theorem.

More generally, a polygon with any number of sides that has an inscribed circle (that is, one that is tangent to each side) is called a tangential polygon.

See also
 
 
 
 
 
 
 
 
 
Triangle conic

Notes

References

External links
 Derivation of formula for radius of incircle of a triangle

Interactive
Triangle incenter   Triangle incircle  Incircle of a regular polygon   With interactive animations
Constructing a triangle's incenter / incircle with compass and straightedge An interactive animated demonstration
 Equal Incircles Theorem at cut-the-knot
 Five Incircles Theorem at cut-the-knot
 Pairs of Incircles in a Quadrilateral at cut-the-knot
An interactive Java applet for the incenter

Circles defined for a triangle